Beam may refer to:

Streams of particles or energy 
Light beam, or beam of light, a directional projection of light energy 
Laser beam
Particle beam, a stream of charged or neutral particles
Charged particle beam, a spatially localized group of electrically charged particles
Cathode ray, or electron beam or e-beam, streams of electrons observed in discharge tubes
X-ray beam, a penetrating form of high-energy electromagnetic radiation
Molecular beam, a beam of particles moving at approximately equal velocities

Arts, entertainment and media
 Anong Beam, Canadian Ojibwe artist and curator
 Beam (music), a connection line in musical notation
 Beam, to transport matter using the Transporter in the Star Trek fictional universe
 Beam (rapper), American hip hop artist
 BEAM.TV, an online digital delivery and content management platform
 BEAM Channel 31, a Philippines television network
 Beam (website), later Mixer, a former video game live streaming platform
 BeamNG.drive, an open-world vehicle simulation video game
 The Beam (fairy tale), the Brothers Grimm tale 149
 Carl Beam (1943-2005), Indigenous Canadian artist

Businesses 
 Beam Software, later Krome Studios Melbourne, an Australian video game development studio
 Beam Suntory, a division of Suntory that produces distilled beverages, including Jim Beam
 Broadcast Enterprises and Affiliated Media, a telecommunications company in the Philippines
 Beam Energy, an energy provision arrangement of British company Robin Hood Energy

Science and technology
 BEAM (Erlang virtual machine), a virtual machine at the core of the Erlang Open Telecom Platform
 BEAM robotics (biology, electronics, aesthetics and mechanics), a style of robotics
 Beam search, a heuristic search algorithm 
 Bigelow Expandable Activity Module, an experimental expandable space station module
 Apache Beam, a data processing programming model
 Beam (structure), a structural element that resists lateral loads

Other uses 
 Beam (horse), a racehorse
 Beam (nautical), the width of a ship at its widest point
 Beam, Great Torrington, an estate in Devon, England
 Balance beam, or beam, a piece of gymnastics equipment
 The Beam (geological outcrop), in South Hero, Vermont, U.S.

See also
Battle of the Beams, a period in World War 2 of air radio navigation countermeasures
Beam theory, or Euler–Bernoulli beam theory, a means of calculating load-carrying and deflection of structural beams
Beam antenna, or directional antenna, an antenna which radiates or receives greater power in specific directions 
Bessel beam, a wave whose amplitude is described by a Bessel function
Blaster beam, a musical instrument
Gaussian beam, a beam of electromagnetic radiation whose amplitude is given by a Gaussian function
Beme (disambiguation)